The December 2009 Lahore attacks were a series of two bomb blasts and a shooting which occurred in a crowded market in Lahore, Pakistan on 7 December 2009. At least 54 people were killed & about 150 others wounded.

Attacks
The blasts took place in the Moon Market of Lahore's Allama Iqbal town late in the night. One of the blasts was in front of Muslim Commercial Bank and the second one was in front of Moon Market faisal irfan jewellers. The two blasts which were within 30 seconds of each other resulted in a blaze which engulfed the shops in the market. The attack came at about 9:00 pm local time and struck a corner of the market where women were buying clothes. After the blasts the militants fired at the people fleeing the scene. Most of the victims were women. The second blast was near an electricity pole and caused a short circuit which is thought to have led to the fire.

Story
After initial investigations Civil Defence District Officer Mazhar Ahmed stated that it appeared that both blasts were caused by suicide bombers. According to preliminary reports the bombers were about 18 years of age and from southern Punjab (Pakistan). The Federal Bureau of Investigation sent a team to the market who collected samples of explosives and other evidence from the site.

Widespread conspiracy theories circulated after the attacks that India and United States were behind the violence and government officials stoked this perception. However analyst Hassan Askari-Rizvi dismissing these theories stated that the idea that India may be behind the terror attacks is "a very widely shared perception, but there's hardly any evidence to substantiate that. They [the militants] have attacked civilians in the past. I think the government consciously creates that confusion."

See also
List of terrorist incidents in Pakistan since 2001

References

External links
Terrorists target market in Lahore, Dawn
20 injured in two explosions in Lahore

21st-century mass murder in Pakistan
Terrorist incidents in Pakistan in 2009
Mass murder in 2009
Improvised explosive device bombings in Pakistan
Spree shootings in Pakistan
Iqbal Town, Lahore
Terrorist incidents in Lahore
December 2009 events in Pakistan
2000s in Lahore
Attacks on buildings and structures in Pakistan
Marketplace attacks in Asia